Rachel Anne Squire (13 July 1954 – 5 January 2006) was a British Labour politician who served as Member of Parliament (MP) for Dunfermline West in Scotland from 1992 general election to 2005, and then for Dunfermline and West Fife from 2005 until her death after a long series of illnesses.

Background
Squire was born in Carshalton, Surrey. She attended the all-female Godolphin and Latymer School in Hammersmith and then proceeded to a degree in Archaeology and Anthropology at Durham University, and a social work qualification at Birmingham University. After university, Squire became a social worker, also working in factories and other manual jobs. She became a full-time official with National Union of Public Employees, the public sector union, later part of UNISON. Working for the union took her to Merseyside and then to Scotland, where she became the union's education officer. She served on the Labour Scottish Executive Committee.

Member of Parliament
According to a profile on the BBC website, Rachel Squire was "one of the most committed and successful constituency advocates in Parliament". She worked to get regeneration funds for her constituency, campaigned for the Rosyth Dockyard and secured funds to put off the closure of the Longannet coal mine.

In Parliament, Squire was a member of the Defence Select Committee and served as PPS to Education ministers Stephen Byers and Estelle Morris from 1997 to 2001.
 
Squire was a patron for Brain Tumour Action, a cancer charity. She was diagnosed with a brain tumour in 1993, and a second one in 2003. On 2 June 2005, she was admitted to hospital after suffering a stroke, thought to have been caused by bleeding stemming from the second brain tumor. She did not recover, and died on 5 January 2006.

Her death prompted the Dunfermline and West Fife by-election, held on 9 February 2006, in which her former seat was won by Willie Rennie for the Liberal Democrats.

References

External links 
 
BBC - Labour MP dies after cancer fight 6 January 2006.
Guardian Unlimited Politics - Ask Aristotle: Rachel Squire MP
TheyWorkForYou.com - Rachel Squire MP
BBC News - Labour MP in hospital with stroke 3 June 2005

1954 births
2006 deaths
Deaths from brain tumor
Scottish Labour MPs
Female members of the Parliament of the United Kingdom for Scottish constituencies
Members of the Parliament of the United Kingdom for Fife constituencies
People educated at Godolphin and Latymer School
People from Surrey
UK MPs 1992–1997
UK MPs 1997–2001
UK MPs 2001–2005
UK MPs 2005–2010
Alumni of Trevelyan College, Durham
Alumni of the University of Birmingham
20th-century Scottish women politicians
20th-century Scottish politicians
21st-century Scottish women politicians
21st-century Scottish politicians